The 2017 Beach Soccer Intercontinental Cup, also known as the Huawei Beach Soccer Intercontinental Cup Dubai 2017 for sponsorship reasons, was the seventh edition of the Beach Soccer Intercontinental Cup, an annual international beach soccer tournament contested by men's national teams, held in Dubai, United Arab Emirates.

After the FIFA Beach Soccer World Cup, the Intercontinental Cup is the biggest tournament in the current international beach soccer calendar. Similar to the FIFA Confederations Cup, eight nations took part, with one team representing each of the six continental football confederations (except for the OFC) as well as the current World Cup champions, Brazil, and the hosts, the United Arab Emirates.

The tournament started with a group stage, played in a round robin format. The winners and runners-up from each group advanced to the knockout stage, in which the teams then competed in single-elimination matches, beginning with the semi-finals and ending with the final. A third-place deciding match was also contested by the losing semi-finalists. The third and fourth placed nations from each group played in a series of consolation matches to decide fifth through eighth place.

This tournament was the last in a deal signed between Beach Soccer Worldwide (BSWW) and the Dubai Sports Council (DSC) in 2012 in which it was agreed the two parties would organise the tournament until 2017. This year's event occurred between October 31 and November 4.

Brazil were the defending champions and successfully retained their title by beating Portugal in the final to claim their third Intercontinental Cup crown.

Participating teams
Eight teams took part including the hosts, current World Cup winners and one of the best performing nations from each of the six regional championships hosted by the confederations of FIFA. However, the OFC did not enter a team this year, so UEFA entered two teams.

As incumbent continental champions, Senegal were originally invited to play as the African representatives but were unable to compete due to financial issues.

Overall, Europe, Asia and South America were represented by two nations, Africa and North America one nation and Oceania, none.

1. Qualified as hosts, but also achieved a 2017 AFC Beach Soccer Championship runners-up finish

Venue
This edition of the Intercontinental Cup took place in a new venue, in Dubai's Business Bay on the banks of the Dubai Water Canal, having taken place on Jumeirah Beach, Dubai Festival City and the Dubai International Marine Club in previous years. The new stadium had a capacity of 3,000.

Speaking at the draw event, BSWW Vice-president thanked the Dubai International Marine Club for hosting the previous events but explained that due to "external reasons" the competition would be hosted in a new part of the city in 2017. He added the new venue would be easier to access by prospective spectators and that tickets would remain free for fans as in previous years.

Sponsors
The following were the official sponsors of the tournament:

Huawei (lead sponsors)
Audi
Al Nabooda Automobiles
Havaianas
Pepsi

Aquafina
Dubai Stars Sportsplex
Pocari Sweat
Havoline
Desert Stallion

Draw
The draw to split the eight teams into two groups of four was conducted at 11:00 GST on October 3 at the headquarters of the DSC in the Dubai Design District. Teams from the same confederation could not be drawn into the same group. The draw was conducted by Aml Wael and Nora Al Mazrouie, members of the UAE's women's national association football team.

For the purposes of the draw, the nations were divided into two sets, Pot 1 and Pot 2, shown in the table below. The  allocation of teams into each Pot was based on previous performances in the championship. The first pot contained the three former champions of the Intercontinental Cup and, additionally,  the hosts. The second pot contained the other four remaining participants who have not won the tournament before. Two teams from each pot were drawn into Group A and two teams from each pot were draw into Group B, with the hosts, the United Arab Emirates, automatically allocated to position A1.

Prior to the draw, the eight teams were described as the strongest contingent the championship had ever seen.

Note: The numbers in parentheses show the world ranking of the teams at the time of the draw.

Group stage
The match schedule was announced on October 11.

Matches are listed as local time in Dubai, GST (UTC+4)

Group A

Group B

Consolation matches
The teams finishing in third and fourth place were knocked out of title-winning contention, receding to play in consolation matches to determine 5th through 8th place in the final standings.

5th to 8th place semi-finals

Seventh place play-off

Fifth place play-off

Knockout stage
The group winners and runners-up progressed to the knockout stage to continue to compete for the title.

Semi-finals

Third place play-off

Final

Awards

Winners trophy

Individual awards

Statistics

Goalscorers

8 goals
 Jordan Santos

7 goals

 Rodrigo
 Bruno Xavier

6 goals

 Lucas
 Carlo Carballo

5 goals

 Mohammad Ahmadzadeh
 Bokinha

4 goals

 Mostafa Kiani
 Datinha
 Haitham Mohamed
 Hasham Almuntaser
 Mohamed Gamal Hassan
 Boris Nikonorov
 Ramón Maldonado
 Elhusseini Taha Rashed Aly

3 goals

 Ahmed Beshr
 Aleksey Makarov
 Madjer
 Hassane Mohamed Hassane Hussein
 Moustafa Ahmed Shaaban

2 goals

 Abdelrahman Hassan Ahmed Hassan 
 José Vizcarra
 Lugiani Gallardo
 Lucao
 Filipe
 Fernando DDI
 Moslem Mesigar 
 Seyed Ali Nazem 
 Mohamed Abdelnaby
 Amir Akbari
 Ali Karim
 Edgar Barreto
 Mauricinho
 Ali Mohammad
 Artur Paporotnyi
 Jesus Rolon
 Kirill Romanov

1 goal

 Duarte Vivo
 Haitham Atef
 Alexey Pavlenko
 Elinton Andrade
 Nikolai Kryshanov
 Be Martins
 Ali Mirshekari
 Mohammad Moradi
 Mohammad Mokhtari
 Bonifacio Roa
 Abbas Ali
 Mohamed Abdelnaby Aly Aly Hassan
 Waleed Bashr
 Hamid Behzadpour
 Yuri Krasheninnikov
 Leo Martins
 Bruno Novo
 Luis Ojeda
 Rafael Padilha
 Angel Rodriguez
 Erick Samano Aleman
 Ulises Torres Pineda
 Peyman Hosseini
 Maxim Chuzhkov

Own goals

 Amir Akbari (vs. Mexico)
 Hassan Abdollahi (vs. Russia)

Source

Final standings

References

External links
Intercontinental Beach Soccer Cup 2017, Beach Soccer Worldwide
Intercontinental Cup 2017 , beachsoccerrussia.ru (in Russian)

Beach Soccer Intercontinental Cup
Beach Soccer Intercontinental Cup
International association football competitions hosted by the United Arab Emirates
Intercontinental Cup
Beach Soccer Intercontinental Cup
Beach Soccer Intercontinental Cup